A Husband for the Month of April (Italian: Un marito per il mese di aprile) is a 1941 Italian "white-telephones" comedy film directed by Giorgio Simonelli and starring Vanna Vanni, Carlo Romano and Pina Renzi.

It was shot at the Cinecittà Studios in Rome. The film's sets were designed by the art director Alfredo Montori.

Synopsis
To distance herself from a persistent suitor, a wealthy young woman hires a man to pose as her husband. Penniless due to his losses at gambling he agrees to take on the role for only the month of April.

Cast
 Vanna Vanni as Mara
 Carlo Romano as Giovanni
 Pina Renzi as La signora Milton
 Guglielmo Sinaz as Il signor Milton
 Romolo Costa as Il marchese Enrico Poli di Torrebruciata
 Vera Carmi as La fioraia
 Fausto Guerzoni as Pietro, il domestico del marchese
 Guido Morisi as José 
 Renato Malavasi as Il fattorino dei fiori
 Arturo Bragaglia as Il vagabondo
 Vasco Creti as 	Il capotreno
 Luigi Garrone as Un ferroviere
 Alfredo Martinelli as Il portiere d'albergo
 Alfredo Menichelli as Il fattorino dei fiori sul treno
 Renzo Merusi as Un amico di Giovanni
 Nico Pepe as Un amico di Giovanni
 Marika Spada as La cameriera
 Dario Taron as Un giocatore di poker

References

Bibliography 
 Brunetta, Gian Piero. The History of Italian Cinema: A Guide to Italian Film from Its Origins to the Twenty-first Century.  Princeton University Press, 2009.

External links 
 

1941 films
Italian comedy films
1941 comedy films
1940s Italian-language films
Films directed by Giorgio Simonelli
Italian black-and-white films
Films shot at Cinecittà Studios
1940s Italian films